Standard Fémina de Liège is Standard Liège's women's section and the most honoured women's football team in Belgium, with 17 national league titles—15 in the Belgian Women's First Division when it was the top level of women's football in the country, and two in the Super League, the current top level. Standard was also the top-placing Belgian team in all three seasons of the now-defunct BeNe League, which served as the joint top-level league for both Belgium and the Netherlands from 2012–13 to 2014–15, and won that league's overall title in its final season.

It was founded in 1971 as Saint-Nicolas FC Liège before taking its current name three years later after winning the inaugural edition of the Belgian league.

Honours

Official
 Super League (2): 2016, 2017
 Belgian Women's First Division (15): 1974, 1976, 1977, 1978, 1982, 1984, 1985, 1986, 1990, 1991, 1992, 1994, 2009, 2011, 2012
 Belgian Women's Cup (7): 1976, 1986, 1989, 1990, 1995, 2006, 2012, 2014
 Belgian Women's Supercup (5): 1984, 1986, 1989, 1994, 2009
 BeNe League
Winners (1): 2015
Runners-up (2): 2013, 2014 (twice best placed Belgian team, thus national champions)
 BeNe Super Cup (2): 2011, 2012

Invitational
 Menton Tournament (1): 1982

UEFA Competitions Record
In its fifth European season Standard hat to start in the qualifying.

Players

Current squad

Former players

Head coaches 
  Mohamed Ayed (2005–2011)
  Henri Depireux (2011–2011) 
   (2011–2014)
   (2014–current)

References

External links

Women's football clubs in Belgium
Standard Liège
Association football clubs established in 1971
1971 establishments in Belgium
BeNe League teams
Sport in Liège